Distichium capillaceum is a species of moss belonging to the family Ditrichaceae.

It has cosmopolitan distribution.

References

Bryopsida